Raska may refer to:

Raska Lukwiya (died 2006), third highest-ranking leader of the Lord's Resistance Army rebel group founded in northern Uganda
Raska (region), spelling variant for the historical region of Raška, in Serbia
Raska på, Alfons Åberg, a book by Gunilla Bergström
Raska fötter, a popular Christmas song in Sweden

See also
Raška (disambiguation)